Agnès Fienga is a French astronomer working at the Institut de Mécanique Céleste et de Calcul des Éphémérides.

She is active in the field of planetary ephemerides generation and is member of the International Astronomical Union (IAU). She collaborated with Dr. E. Myles Standish in researches on the asteroids and their impact on the orbital motions. Fienga is also interested in testing gravitational theories from planetary motions. She has recently processed Cassini ranging data, finding an anomalous feature of motion in Saturn's orbit, according to the results by Dr. Elena V. Pitjeva.

According to the NASA ADS database, the h-index of A. Fienga is 9, with a total number of citations (self-citations excluded) equal to 208.

References

External links
 Dr. Fienga webpage at IAU
 A. Fienga @ UTINAM

21st-century French astronomers
Women astronomers
Living people
Year of birth missing (living people)